Brandon Lee Frye (born January 23, 1983) is a former American football offensive tackle. He was drafted by the Houston Texans in the fifth round of the 2007 NFL Draft. He played college football at Virginia Tech.

Frye also played for the Miami Dolphins and Seattle Seahawks.

He currently resides in the Washington, DC metro area.

College career
Frye played college football for the Virginia Tech Hokies. After playing sparingly his first three seasons, he earned the starting left job at the end of the 2005 season for the Toyota Gator Bowl against Louisville after Jimmy Martin was injured. He retained the starting job during the 2006 season and started all but two games his final year with the Hokies.

References

External links
Houston Texans bio
Virginia Tech Hokies bio

1983 births
Living people
People from Myrtle Beach, South Carolina
Players of American football from South Carolina
American football offensive tackles
American football offensive guards
Virginia Tech Hokies football players
Houston Texans players
Miami Dolphins players
Seattle Seahawks players